The Hayden Building, also known as the Hayden-Clinton Bank Building, is a historic building on Capitol Square in Downtown Columbus, Ohio. It was listed on the National Register of Historic Places in 2009. Built in 1869, it is one of the oldest remaining commercial buildings on Capitol Square. It was designed by Nathan Kelley, one of the architects of the Ohio Statehouse.

See also
 National Register of Historic Places listings in Columbus, Ohio

References

External links
 

Bank buildings on the National Register of Historic Places in Ohio
Italianate architecture in Ohio
Commercial buildings completed in 1869
Buildings in downtown Columbus, Ohio
National Register of Historic Places in Columbus, Ohio
1869 establishments in Ohio
Broad Street (Columbus, Ohio)